Peter J. Green, born in Neath, Wales, is a retired professional dog show handler and a current dog show judge. He shares the record for the most Best in Show victories at the Westminster Kennel Club Dog Show, having won four times: 1968, 1977, 1994, and 1998.

Green judged Best in Show at the 2019 Westminster Kennel Club Dog Show.

References

Dog judges
Year of birth missing (living people)
Living people
Westminster Kennel Club Dog Show